Undertow is a steel spinning roller coaster at Santa Cruz Beach Boardwalk, built by Maurer Söhne.

History
Santa Cruz Beach Boardwalk announced on March 23, 2012 that Hurricane would close in September and be replaced by a new thrill ride in 2013. On August 27, Undertow was officially announced. Construction started after Hurricane closed on September 3. The ride officially opened to the public on October 19, 2013.

See also
 2013 in amusement parks

References

Roller coasters in California
Santa Cruz Beach Boardwalk